Blaseball is a baseball simulation horror game developed by The Game Band. It was released on July 20, 2020, and is played via web browser. During each week the game is active, a full season and championship series of "Internet League Blaseball" is simulated, with elections on Sundays in which the community can change the rules of the game.  Non-player characters, such as the league's owner or commissioner, occasionally deliver dialogue on the website and through Twitter accounts, creating an absurdist horror narrative.

The game has an active fandom known for their prolific fan works. There is a high degree of audience participation, with the game's developers actively engaging with the fan community online.

Gameplay
Blaseball centers on an absurdist simulation of baseball, with fictional teams, featuring random events such as the "incineration" of players by "rogue umpires". Each player has a name and a star rating, which is used to determine their stats, as well as amusing trivia such as their preferred coffee type and their pre-game rituals. After their first log-in, users choose a favorite team and are given some coins. The game allows users to use these coins to bet on the outcomes of the simulated games. Fans could previously also "idol" players and earn coins based on their performance, though this feature is currently absent. Each season lasts a week, and users are able to follow what happens in real time. The matches are organized every day on the hour, while the post-season happens in two parts, with wild card matches and quarterfinals happening on Friday and semifinals and finals happening on Saturday. Users are able to use their coins to purchase votes, which can be used to vote on events and rule changes that will happen after each season on Sunday.

Narratively, the story of Blaseball unfolds across eras spanning multiple seasons, and largely impacted by players' collective choices through elections.  These eras include the Discipline Era, marked by the league banding against a giant malevolent peanut known as The Shelled One, and the Expansion Era, featuring a coin dubbed only as The Boss who wished to add increasingly complex rules to the sport.  Currently, The Coronation Era is ongoing.  

On July 30, 2021, as the Expansion Era ended, Blaseball became unplayable due to a black hole consuming the league. Starting October 28, 2022, a weekly event called The Fall occurred announcing one random returning player falling from the black hole to each team, as well as announcing vague new sign-up goals and game mechanics, leading up to the return of Blaseball. On January 9th, 2023, the game resumed with a clean slate, featuring the same teams but with entirely new rosters consisting of both new and returning players, with all stats randomized.  Due to mixed feedback to the new experience, The Game Band opted to place the game back on a brief siesta on February 3, 2023, to address concerns before resuming play.

As of February 2023, there are 24 teams:

Atlantis Georgias
Baltimore Crabs
Boston Flowers
Broken Ridge Jazz Hands (formerly Breckenridge)
Canada Moist Talkers
Charleston Shoe Thieves
Chicago Firefighters
Core Mechanics
Dallas Steaks
Hades Tigers
Hawai'i Fridays
Houston Spies
Kansas City Breath Mints
LA Unlimited Tacos
Mexico City Wild Wings
Miami Dale
Moab Hellmouth Sunbeams
New York Millennials
Ohio Worms
Philly Pies
San Francisco Lovers
Seattle Garages
Tokyo Lift
Yellowstone Magic

Development
Sam Rosenthal, the creative director of The Game Band, spent some time on video conference calls during a quarantine caused by the COVID-19 pandemic with friends who do not usually play video games, but were still eager to play browser adaptations of board games. The idea of creating a title that would bring people together attracted the developers. At first, he thought to make a horse-racing gambling game, but the team decided that the whole concept was better suited for baseball.

From August 9, 2020, to August 24, 2020, The Game Band put the game on a temporary hiatus, citing the problems associated with running into unexpected viral popularity. Blaseball was put on another hiatus, referred to as a "Grand Siesta", from October 25, 2020, to March 1, 2021.

The Expansion Era ended in July 2021, and Blaseball went into a lengthy siesta, allowing the Game Band to work on overhauling the game. On November 1, 2021, it was announced that Blaseball would return for a shorter format season, called Blaseball: Short Circuits, for the purpose of testing out quality of life improvements and new features. On October 26, 2022, The Game Band announced that Blaseball would be returning with a prologue, beginning on October 28, 2022. The Game Band also announced a mobile version of Blaseball would be released around the same time.

Fanbase and community 
Blaseball is known for its sizeable fan community, which has developed a deep lore around the game and its teams. Fans have also contributed by creating art and social media accounts for Blaseball players, leagues, sportscasters and union representatives. The Blaseball community often uses its platform to engage in charity and activism, including charitable donations through the collectively-run merchandise store Blaseball Cares, campaigning for Nithya Raman for LA council, and running a series of Industrial Workers of the World union training courses.

Fan-created works

Awards 

Blaseball was a 2021 finalist for the Nebula Award for Best Game Writing. It was also nominated for Best Video Game at the 2021 Hugo Awards.

In July 2021, Blaseball won the Nuovo Award at the 2021 Independent Games Festival.

References

Bibliography

External links 
Official website
Blaseball Cares

2020 video games
Video games developed in the United States
Absurdist fiction
Baseball video games
Fantasy sports video games
Simulation video games
Browser games
Browser-based multiplayer online games
Parody video games
2020s horror video games
Video games about death games
Esports games
Independent Games Festival winners